José Antonio Tébez (13 June 1949 – 26 September 2018) was an Argentine professional footballer who played as a midfielder for San Martín de Mendoza, Santa Fe and Independiente Medellín.

References

1949 births
2018 deaths
Argentine footballers
San Martín de Mendoza footballers
Independiente Santa Fe footballers
Independiente Medellín footballers
Argentine Primera División players
Categoría Primera A players
Association football midfielders
Argentine expatriate footballers
Argentine expatriate sportspeople in Colombia
Expatriate footballers in Colombia
People from Comodoro Rivadavia